Juan Martínez may refer to:

Arts and entertainment
Juan Martínez Montañés (1568–1649), sculptor of the Spanish Golden Age
Juan Martínez de Jáuregui y Aguilar (1583–1641), poet and painter of the Spanish Golden Age
Juan Martínez Abades (1862–1920), Spanish painter
 (1901–1976), Chilean architect
Juan Luis Martínez (1942–1993), Chilean poet and writer

Law and politics
Juan Martínez de Ampiés (died 1533), Spanish army officer, first governor of Venezuela Province
Juan Martínez de Rozas (1759–1813), Chilean lawyer and politician
Juan Antonio Martínez (died 1854), interim President of Guatemala
Juan Ramon Martinez (politician) (born 1941), Honduran newspaper columnist and politician
Juan Manuel Martínez Nava (born 1954), Mexican politician
Juan Antonio Martínez Varela (Minister of Defense of El Salvador) (fl. 1999–2004), Salvadoran defense minister

Religion
Juan Martínez (bishop of Lugo), Galician clergyman
Juan Martínez Silíceo (1486–1557), Spanish Roman Catholic bishop, cardinal and mathematician
Juan Manual Martínez de Manzanillo (died 1592), Venezuelan Roman Catholic bishop
Juan Martínez de Ripalda (1594–1668), Spanish Jesuit theologian

Sports

Association football (soccer)
Juan Ramón Martínez (footballer) (born 1948), Salvadoran footballer
Juan Martínez Martínez (born 1955), Spanish footballer, and current coach of CD Castellón
Juan Ignacio Martínez (born 1964), Spanish footballer
Juan Martínez Munuera (born 1982), Spanish football referee
Juan Martínez Marconi (born 1982), Chilean footballer
Juan Manuel Martínez (born 1985), Argentine footballer
Juan Carlos Martínez Camarena (born 1991), Mexican footballer
Juan David Martínez (born 2001), Colombian footballer

Track and field
Juan Máximo Martínez (1947–2021), Mexican long-distance runner
Juan Martínez Brito (born 1958), Cuban discus thrower
Juan Martínez Martin (born 1980), Spanish track and field athlete

Water sports
Juan Martínez (swimmer) (born 1946), Spanish swimmer
Juan Martínez (canoeist born 1950), Mexican sprint canoer who competed in the 1960s and 1970s
Juan Martínez (1990s canoeist), Mexican sprint canoer who competed in the 1990s

Other sports
Juan Antonio Martínez (fencer) (born 1920), Cuban fencer
Juan Martínez (equestrian) (1924–1994), Spanish Olympic equestrian
Juan Antonio Martínez (basketball) (born 1944), Spanish basketball player
Juan Tomás Martínez (born 1962), Spanish cyclist
Juan Martínez Oliver (born 1964), Spanish road bicycle racer
Juan Martínez de Irujo (born 1981), Spanish Basque pelota player

Others
Juan Martínez de Recalde (c.1540–1588), Spanish naval officer

Other uses
Portrait of Juan Martínez Montañés, Spanish oil painting by Diego Velázquez

See also
San Juan y Martínez